Manny Hoffman (February 22, 1937 – February 27, 2013) was an American businessman and politician.

Hoffman was born in Chicago, Illinois and graduated from Hirsch High School. He went to Northwestern University, Purdue University and to Midwest Broadcasting School. He served in the United States Air Force Reserves from 1954 to 1962. He lived in Homewood, Illinois with his wife and family and was involved with the insurance business. Hoffman served as mayor of Homewood, Illinois from 1985 to 1991 and was a Republican. Hoffman served in the Illinois House of Representatives in 1991 and 1992. Hoffman died in Sarasota, Florida.

Notes

|-

1937 births
2013 deaths
Businesspeople from Chicago
Politicians from Chicago
People from Homewood, Illinois
Military personnel from Illinois
Northwestern University alumni
Purdue University alumni
Mayors of places in Illinois
Republican Party members of the Illinois House of Representatives
20th-century American businesspeople